Jörg Breu the Younger (c. 1510 – 1547) was a painter of Augsburg. He was the son of Jörg Breu the Elder, and collaborated with his father on some works.

In the 1540s, he was involved with the creation of the Fechtbucher commissioned by Paulus Hector Mair. He did also wood carvings Lebenstreppen, together with Cornelis Anthonisz

Work 
A selection:
 Madonna with child
 Conquest of Rhodos by Queen Artemisia, 1535. Bavarian State Painting Collections}, Munich
 Der reiche Prasser und der arme Lazarus, 1535
 Festival in Venice, 1539
 History of Suzanne, 1540
 Kaiserl. Schlittenfahrt, vers 1540
 Siege of Algiers, 1541
 Sacrifice of Isaac, 1545

References 

16th-century German painters
German male painters
Artists from Augsburg
1510 births
1547 deaths